Brigadier-General Julian Hasler (16 October 1868 – 27 April 1915), was a British Army officer in World War I.

Early life
Julian Hasler was born in Aldingbourne, West Sussex on 16 October 1868, the second son of William Wyndham Hasler, a wealthy landowner and Justice of the Peace for Sussex, and Selina Sarah Hervey, a member of the extended family of the Marquess of Bristol. After spending his early year at Aldingbourne House, his ancestral home, he attended Winchester College from 1882 to 1885.

Military career
After the academy, Julian Hasler was commissioned into the 1st Battalion of the East Kent Regiment, on 19 September 1888, and soon promoted to lieutenant on 4 February 1892. From 1895 he was almost uninterruptedly in active military service, first with the Chitral Relief Force (1895), then the Northwest Frontier in India as a captain (1897-1898, where he participated in the capture of the Tanga Pass), in South Africa (1900-1902) where he raised the Hasler's Australian Scouts, briefly in Nigeria where he documented a new species of Red-fronted gazelle, and in West Africa (1899-1900, 1903-1910).

He was wounded several times and mentioned twice in dispatches because of his bravery. He was promoted to major on 7 February 1907 and to lieutenant colonel on 4 August 1914.

First World War
After the outbreak of the war, he was promoted Brigadier-General and sent to France in September 1914. There, he was given command of the 1st Battalion of the Buffs. Wounded in October of the same year, he briefly returned home for convalescence. In December he went back to the front, where he was in command of the 11th Infantry Brigade. He distinguished himself for gallantry and resilience and was mentioned in dispatches twice by Field Marshal Sir John French.

Death
The 11th Brigade was operating as part of 4th division in the area of Ploegsteert Wood, Belgium close to the French Border. On 24 April 1915 it was sent north to reinforce the 5th Corps in the Ypres salient and was subsequently attached to  28th Division, taking over the front line between BERLIN WOOD and FORTUIN. On 27 April 1915, Hasler fell in action at St. Jean, near Ypres in Belgium, in the context of the Second battle of Ypres, being the second general to die because of heavy shelling of an advanced headquarter that was placed too close to the salient. His commanding officer, Major-General Edward Bulfin, had ordered him to abandon the position after dark on that same day, but he was delayed and was killed around 9pm that evening. 

His death features in a number of war diaries of the time. He left a wife, Edith Gwendolin Orr-Ewing, and two young children.

Notes

References

External links
 Record on the Commonwealth War Graves Commission website

1868 births
British Army brigadiers
British Army personnel of World War I
1915 deaths
British military personnel killed in World War I